Kamal Akhtar or Kamaal Akhtar or Kamaal Akhtar Tyagi (born 24 October 1971) is a member of the 18th Legislative Assembly  and has earlier been the former Panchayati Raj Minister of Uttar Pradesh, former Member of the Legislative Assembly, and a politician from Samajwadi Party as well as a former Member of the Parliament of India representing Uttar Pradesh in the Rajya Sabha, the upper house of the Indian Parliament. He belongs to Ujhari, Jyotiba Phule Nagar District.

He lost his seat in the 2017 Uttar Pradesh Assembly election to Mahender Singh Kadakhvashi of the Bharatiya Janata Party.

He won his seat in the 2022 Uttar Pradesh Assembly election from Kanth (Moradabad).

Personal life
Kamaal Akhtar was born to Nafeesuddin Ahmad and Mahajabin in Ujhari. He completed his B.A. (Hons.) in Economics and LL.B. at the Jamia Milia Islamia, New  Delhi. His wife Humara Akhter was Samajwadi Party Lok sabha candidate from Amroha in the sixteenth Lok sabha election.

Achievements 

2022: Member of 18th Uttar Pradesh Assembly from Kanth, Moradabad

References

External links
 Profile on Rajya Sabha website

1971 births
People from Amroha district
Jamia Millia Islamia alumni
Uttar Pradesh politicians
Samajwadi Party politicians
Living people
Uttar Pradesh MLAs 2022–2027
Samajwadi Party politicians from Uttar Pradesh